Al-Fahad Sport Club, is an Iraqi football team based in Al-Khalidiya, Al-Anbar, that plays in the Iraq Division Two.

Stadium after ISIS era
After ISIS took over Al-Anbar, several battles took place between ISIS and the Iraqi army. Some of those battles took place on the club's stadium, until the Iraqi army managed to liberate Al-Khalidiya in July 2015. After the liberation, the club's president and a number of fans demanded the Ministry of Youth and Sports to rehabilitate the stadium, because it falls under the supervision of this ministry.

Managerial history
  Jabbar Hameed

See also 
 Battle of Ramadi (2014–2015)
 2012–13 Iraq FA Cup
 2020–21 Iraq FA Cup

References

External links
 Al-Fahad SC on Goalzz.com
 Iraq Clubs- Foundation Dates

2010 establishments in Iraq
Association football clubs established in 2010
Football clubs in Al-Anbar